Jean-Louis Arcand (born 1964) is a Canadian economist. He is a professor of International Economics  at the Graduate Institute of International and Development Studies in Geneva, where he also head of the PhD Development Economics programme. Arcand is also the head of the Department of Economics at the Graduate Institute. He is president of the Global Development Network, a founding fellow of the European Union Development Network and senior fellow at the Fondation pour les études et recherches en développement international.

Diplomas 
Jean-Louis Arcand holds a PhD in economics from MIT.

Contributions 
In 2012 Jean-Louis authored (with Enrico Berkes and Ugo Panizza) the IMF working paper Too Much Finance which establishes that:

Career 
Jean-Louis Arcand is Director of the Centre for Finance and Development and a member of the Centre on Conflict, Development and Peacebuilding, and Professor of International Economics at the Graduate Institute of International and Development Studies in Geneva, which he joined in 2008. From 2009 to 2012 he was chair of Development Studies. He is a Founding Fellow of the European Union Development Network (EUDN) and Senior Fellow at the Fondation pour les études et recherches en développement international (FERDI). He was assistant and then Associate Professor at the University of Montréal, and Professor at the Centre d'Etudes et de Recherches en Développement International (CERDI).

References

External links 
  at the Graduate Institute of International and Development Studies website

1964 births
Living people
Canadian economists
MIT School of Humanities, Arts, and Social Sciences alumni
Academic staff of the Graduate Institute of International and Development Studies